Hilldale is an unincorporated community in Summers County, West Virginia, United States. Hilldale is located on West Virginia Route 3 and West Virginia Route 12, east of Hinton.

References

Unincorporated communities in Summers County, West Virginia
Unincorporated communities in West Virginia